Joseph Tucker Davidson (born March 25, 1996) is an American professional baseball pitcher for the Los Angeles Angels of Major League Baseball (MLB). He played college baseball at Midland College. He was drafted by the Atlanta Braves in the 19th round of the 2016 MLB draft, and made his MLB debut with them in 2020.

Amateur career
Davidson attended Tascosa High School ('14) in Amarillo, Texas. There he played baseball (as a starting pitcher) and football (as a quarterback).

Passed over in the baseball draft, he played college baseball at Midland College in Texas. For Midland in his sophomore year in 2016, Davidson was 6–2 with a 2.27 ERA and 75 strikeouts in 71.1 innings. He was named All-Western Junior College Athletic Conference first team.

Professional career

2016–19
Davidson was drafted by the Atlanta Braves in the 19th round of the 2016 Major League Baseball draft. Davidson ended his collegiate baseball career to sign with the Braves organization, instead of joining the NC State Wolfpack baseball team as he had planned.

Davidson made his professional debut with the Rookie-level Gulf Coast Braves, going 0–3 with a 1.52 ERA and 32 strikeouts in  innings in 11 games (one start). He spent 2017 with the Class A Rome Braves, pitching to a 5–4 record with two saves and a 2.60 ERA in  innings over 31 games (12 starts).

He then played 2018 with the Florida Fire Frogs of the Class A-Advanced Florida State League, compiling a 7–10 record and 4.18 ERA in 14 starts. Davidson started 2019 with the AA Mississippi Braves and was named a Southern League All-Star, before being promoted to the Gwinnett Stripers of the Triple-A East with whom he had four starts. Over 25 starts between both clubs, he went 8–7 with a 2.15 ERA in 25 starts, striking out 134 over  innings.

2020–present
Davidson was added to the Braves' 40 man roster following the 2019 season. Before the 2020 Minor League Baseball season was canceled as a result of the COVID-19 pandemic, Davidson was scheduled to begin the year at Gwinnett. Instead, he was named to the Atlanta Braves' 60-member player pool for the shortened 2020 Major League Baseball season. Davidson was promoted to the major leagues for the first time from the team's alternate site on September 25, 2020. Davidson faced the Boston Red Sox the next day and took the loss, yielding two earned runs and seven total, in  innings pitched, in his only game of the season.

In 2021, in four starts for the Braves, Davidson was 0–0 with a 3.60 ERA in 20 innings. For Gwinnett, he was 2–2 in four starts with a 1.17 ERA in 23 innings in which he struck out 28 batters, giving up only 11 hits and 5 walks. On June 24, 2021, Davidson was placed on the 60-day injured list with left forearm inflammation.

On October 27, 2021, Davidson was added to the Braves' roster for the World Series against the Houston Astros after Charlie Morton suffered a fractured fibula. On October 31, 2021, he was announced as the starter for Game 5. Davidson pitched two innings, giving up four runs (two earned) and did not factor into the decision of the Braves’ eventual 9–5 loss. The team would go on to win the World Series as they won the game with a score of 7–0 in Houston. 

On April 7, 2022, it was announced that Davidson had made the Braves Opening Day roster for the first time in his career. He pitched the first five innings of a shutout against the Milwaukee Brewers on May 17 for his first career victory.

Los Angeles Angels
On August 2, 2022, Davidson and Jesse Chavez were traded from the Atlanta Braves to the Los Angeles Angels for Raisel Iglesias.

References

External links

1996 births
Living people
Sportspeople from Amarillo, Texas
Baseball players from Texas
Major League Baseball pitchers
Midland College alumni
Atlanta Braves players
Los Angeles Angels players
Gulf Coast Braves players
Rome Braves players
Florida Fire Frogs players
Mississippi Braves players
Gwinnett Stripers players